Secamone cuneifolia is a species of plant in the family Asclepiadaceae. It is endemic to Socotra.  Its natural habitats are subtropical or tropical dry forests and subtropical or tropical dry shrubland.

References

Endemic flora of Socotra
cuneifolia
Vulnerable plants
Taxonomy articles created by Polbot